Samuel Hannaford House is a registered historic building located at 768 Derby Avenue in Spring Grove Village, Cincinnati, Ohio. It was listed in the National Register on March 3, 1980.

References

External links 
768 Derby Avenue, Cincinnati, Ohio at Google Maps

National Register of Historic Places in Cincinnati
Houses in Cincinnati
Houses on the National Register of Historic Places in Ohio